Gilmore is an unincorporated community in Le Flore County, Oklahoma, United States. The town, formerly incorporated, boasted a small post office (between 1890 and 1918), city hall, and Mayor Pratt McMillin, a rancher and oil distributor who died in April 2001, aged 84.

The primary population of Gilmore lives around the intersection of Nail Creek Road and Gilmore Road just east of Poteau and north of Monroe, although in recent years, multiple houses have been built along Nail Creek Road west of Gilmore Road, expanding the community towards the town of Poteau. The town is home to the Vaughn Memorial Cemetery which was adjacent to the Double Branch Baptist Church until the church burned down in the late 2000s.

The surrounding area consists primarily of farmland and forest situated in the Poteau River Valley region between Sugar Loaf Mountain, Oklahoma Peak, and Cavanal Hill with a tributary of the Poteau River, Nail Creek running through Gilmore.

Location
The area of the town was originally located in Sugar Loaf County, Moshulatubbee District of the Choctaw Nation.

Today, the town is located in Choctaw Nation, District 4.

History
A post office opened at Gilmore, Indian Territory on June 30, 1890.  It closed on January 15, 1918.  It was named for Rad Gilmore, a local mill operator.

In the 1884 election campaign for sheriff of Sugar Loaf County, Bob Benton and Charles Wilson ran against each other. Benton and Jack Crow shot and killed Wilson outside the county courthouse near Summerfield. Even though Benton shot first, Crow delivered the fatal shot and was the only man to stand trial in the case under Judge Parker. Wilson was buried in Vaughn Cemetery.

On November 22, 1983, an F3 tornado hit the town after traveling 16 miles from Reichert and Howe, ending in Gilmore. There were no reported injuries or fatalities.

References

Unincorporated communities in Le Flore County, Oklahoma
Unincorporated communities in Oklahoma
Fort Smith metropolitan area